Grasim Mr. India (formerly Adonis - Graviera Man of the Year) was a national male beauty pageant in India that annually selected representatives to compete globally at Mr. International, Mister World, Mr. Intercontinental and Best Model of the World. In the years 1996 and 1998, the winner of the contest represented India at Mister World contest. Later the title was changed to "Mr. India" International and the winner was sent to compete at Mr. International pageant. Later in 2007 and 2008, Hayward 5000 organized Mr India pageant and the winner was sent to Mister World. In 2010 and 2012, Grasim Mr. India again sent its winner to Mister World and the title was renamed Mr India World. Since 2014, The Times Group owns the right to organize Mr India World contest and its winner represents India at Mister World.

History
The first Mister India called Graviera Adonis Man of the Year contest was held in 1995. Bikram Saluja of Punjab was named the first ever Mister India and represented India at Mister World, where he was placed among top 10 finalists.

The Pageant
In earlier years, the winner of Grasim Mr. India Pageant used to represent India at Mister World contest. From 1997 to 2003 the winner was sent to Mr. International and on some occasions the winner was also sent to compete at other international pageants like Mr. Intercontinental or Best Model of the World.

Winners

India representatives to international pageants 
The following male models have represented India in international pageants:

Representatives to Mister World
Usually the winner of Mister India pageant represented India at Mister World but if for any reason the winner is unable to compete then a runner up was sent to the pageant.India has been participating in Mister World since its inception in 1996. India did not compete in the Mister World from 2000 & 2003. Since 2014 representatives to Mister World are being sent by Mr India World

Representatives to Mr. International
 Usually the winner of Mister India pageant represented India at Mr. International but if for any reason the winner is unable to compete then a runner up is sent to compete at the pageant.

Representatives to Mr. Intercontinental

Representatives to Best Model of the World

See also
 Mister World India 
 Sports in India

References

Beauty pageants in India
Male beauty pageants
Indian awards